The Little River is a  stream in Allen and Huntington counties in northeastern Indiana. A tributary of the Wabash River, it is sometimes called the "Little Wabash", which may cause it to be confused with the Little Wabash River of Illinois.

The Little River follows the Wabash-Erie Channel or "sluiceway," a remnant of the Maumee Torrent that drained ancient Glacial Lake Maumee at the end of the Wisconsin glaciation, and joins the Wabash just west of Huntington.

The Little River is part of the Wabash River Heritage Corridor, created by the Indiana General Assembly in 1991 to commemorate the historic portage that linked the Wabash River watershed with that of Lake Erie.

At Huntington, Indiana, the Little River has a mean annual discharge of 256 cubic feet per second.

See also
List of rivers of Indiana

References

External links

National Weather Service: Little River Hydrograph
Little River Wetlands Project
Maumee-Wabash Portage: The Glorious Gate
Indiana Code: Wabash River Heritage Corridor
Wabash River Heritage Corridor Commission
Little River confluence with Wabash River: Topographic Map from TopoQuest

Rivers of Allen County, Indiana
Rivers of Huntington County, Indiana
Rivers of Indiana
Tributaries of the Wabash River